"Walking on Broken Glass" is a song written and performed by Scottish singer Annie Lennox, included on her debut solo studio album, Diva (1992). Released on 10 August 1992, the single peaked at number one in Canada, number eight in the United Kingdom and Ireland and number 14 in the United States.

Critical reception
AllMusic editor Thom Jurek viewed the song as a "ubiquitous" hit. Jennifer Bowles from Associated Press described it as a "more upbeat, mocking tune". Larry Flick from Billboard wrote that it is a "study in stylistic contrasts; retro-soul vocal musing glides atop a pristine, keyboard-and string-anchored modern-pop environment." He also deemed it a "sophisticated, complex respite from the color-by-numbers fare that crowds radio airwaves." Randy Clark from Cashbox stated that the song "is pretty much straight up, but mature pop, and contains more shattered relationship lyrics (I wonder "why") backed by light percussion, piano, strings and an elaborate background vocal arrangement." Stephanie Zacharek from Entertainment Weekly noted that "the jaunty, Caribbean-flavored "Walking on Broken Glass" (faintly reminiscent of Eurythmics' "Right by Your Side") is laden with sharp-edged metaphors for broken love affairs."

Mike Ragogna from HuffPost wrote that Lennox "rolls out its words Joan Armatrading-style, proclaiming 'Every one of us is made to suffer, every one of us is made to weep.' Then, almost to prove the opposite point, she happily gavottes with the groove." Dennis Hunt from Los Angeles Times named it the "highlight" of the solo debut album and "one of the best tunes she’s ever had." A reviewer from Music Week called it "immediately and extremely commercial, with Annie's voice reaching up from a sea of strings. Polished and superior". Kjell Moe from Norwegian newspaper Nordly stated that the song has "clear Kate Bush-references". Pop Rescue said it is a "pretty catchy track", adding that Lennox' vocals and the backing vocals all "shine perfectly".

Music video
 
Directed by British director Sophie Muller, the music video for "Walking on Broken Glass" is based in part on the 1988 film Dangerous Liaisons, and on period films dealing with the late 18th century, such as Amadeus. John Malkovich, who starred in the former film, is joined by Hugh Laurie, in garb similar to the 18th-century dress he wore to play the Prince Regent in Blackadder the Third.

The setting of the video is that of a salon evening at the Prince Regent's Carlton House. It presents an assembly of nobles and notables for an evening of society, gambling and dancing, the highlight of which is the arrival and feting of the newlyweds. The groom is played by Malkovich.

Lennox's character wears a royal red in an environment dominated by white, a costuming technique designed to draw attention to her, and sports a 'Turkish' headdress in an environment dominated by wigs of the period. She displays significant pique as she is emotionally wounded by the appearance of her former lover on the arm of his new bride.

Throughout the video, Lennox's character communicates conflicting emotions of jealousy, continued desire, and anger towards the man who still holds her heart. In the process, she spurns the previously welcome advances of the Prince Regent, much to his embarrassment, consumes glass after glass of champagne and grows ever more agitated, until she finally throws herself at Malkovich's character, to the shock and amusement of the partygoers. Lennox's character, realizing that she has made a fool of herself, flees the party in a fury, only to be swept into Malkovich's arms when she reaches the foot of the stairs.

Track listings

CD single

Tracks 2 to 5 were recorded for MTV Unplugged in July 1992.

UK CD single

Personnel
 Engineer – Heff Moraes
 Producer – Stephen Lipson
 Written by – Annie Lennox

Charts and certifications

Weekly charts

Year-end charts

Certifications

See also
 List of number-one singles of 1992 (Canada)

References

External links
 

1992 songs
1992 singles
Annie Lennox songs
Arista Records singles
Music videos directed by Sophie Muller
RPM Top Singles number-one singles
Song recordings produced by Stephen Lipson
Songs about heartache
Songs written by Annie Lennox